Miller–Claytor House is a historic home located at Riverside Park in Lynchburg, Virginia.  It is a two-story, white framed structure, sheathed with beaded weatherboards. It is believed to be the fourth house erected in the new town in 1791, and is probably the oldest extant Lynchburg dwelling. In 1936, the imminent demolition of the house led to the formation of the Lynchburg Historical Society and the subsequent removal of the house to its present site.

It was listed on the National Register of Historic Places in 1976.

Gallery

References

External links

Miller–Claytor House, Miller–Claytor Lane at Treasure Island Road, Lynchburg, Virginia: 3 photos, 1 data page, and 1 photo caption page, at Historic American Buildings Survey

Historic American Buildings Survey in Virginia
Houses on the National Register of Historic Places in Virginia
Houses completed in 1791
Georgian architecture in Virginia
Houses in Lynchburg, Virginia
National Register of Historic Places in Lynchburg, Virginia